The Revenge Files of Alistair Fury is the name of a series of children's books, written by Jamie Rix, and of the TV series based on the books. The book series was originally entitled The War Diaries of Alistair Fury, but new releases of the books have been renamed to The Revenge Files in order to match the TV series' title.

Books
There are six books in the series and each is also available in Audiobook format.
 Bugs on the Brain
 Dead Dad Dog
 The Kiss of Death
 Tough Turkey
 Summer Helliday
 Exam Fever

TV series
The Revenge Files of Alistair Fury, airs on BBC One and the CBBC Channel. The Australian Broadcasting Corporation also aired it on ABC1. It follows 11-year-old Alistair Fury (Jonathan Mason) who starts a club called The Revengers, which he operates through his website. Through this club, he attempts to get his own back on his annoying family, and the programme charts his revenges against them, as well as others. His family consist of his mother Celia (Susannah Doyle), his father Sean (Brendan Dempsey), his older brother William (Carlton Dickinson) and eldest sibling Melanie (Natalie Kemp). Also appearing is Alistair's grandmother, Constance (Kate Binchy). He is assisted in his "Revenges" by two friends, Aaron Pryce and  Ralph Ming (Alex Smith).

The opening title sequence is based on Bob Dylan's video for Subterranean Homesick Blues.  Each opening title sequence has differences in it from the others.

 Verucca-Venge! (7 January 2008)
 Cooking with Pets (14 January 2008)
 The Lord of the Fury's (21 January 2008)
 I'm Not Scared (28 January 2008)
 Technology Bytes (4 February 2008)
 The Luck of the Irish (11 February 2008)
 The Gutter Press (18 February 2008)
 Haircut of Horrors (25 February 2008)
 Crazy Like a Frog (3 March 2008)
 Alice in the Middle (10 March 2008)
 The M Factor (17 March 2008)
 Family Fortunes (24 March 2008)
 The Great Trainer Robbery (31 March 2008)

Characters

Awards
In 2008 The Revenge Files of Alistair Fury  won a BAFTA Children's Drama Award.

References

External links
 

2008 British television series debuts
2000s British children's television series
BBC children's television shows
Works by Jamie Rix
Television series by Little Brother Productions
Television shows set in Newcastle upon Tyne